Kutzneria is a genus of bacteria in the phylum Actinomycetota.  This genus was named after Hans-Jürgen Kutzner, a German microbiologist.

Morphology & Biology
Kutzneria are non-motile, aerobic, mesophilic, thermotolerant, Gram positive, chemo-organotrophs.  They have stable, branched, cottony aerial mycelium.  Their cell walls contain N-acetylated muramic acid and meso-diaminopimelic acid.  They produce spores which are either cocci, bacilli or oval.  They are long sporangiophores measuring up to 50 micrometres which are formed by septation of coiled, unbranched hyphae within the sporangiophores.

Species
Some of the species are:
 Kutzneria albida; first described by Furumai, Ogawa, and Okuda in 1968,
 Kutzneria kofuensis; first described by Nonomura and Ohara 1969 (named after Kofu, a district in Japan, where the organism was isolated),
 Kutzneria viridogrisea; first described by Okuda, Furumai, Watanabe, Okugawa, and Kimura in 1966.

These species were previously classified under the family Streptosporangiaceae (suborder Streptosporangineae) and were known as Streptosporangium albidum, Streptosporangium viridogriseum (subspecies kofuense), and Streptosporangium viridogriseum, respectively.

References

Further reading

Actinomycetales
Bacteria genera